Elections to Bury Metropolitan Borough Council were held on 4 May 2006.  One third of the council was up for election, and the Labour Party lost control of the council.

After the election, the composition of the council was
Labour 23
Conservative 22
Liberal Democrat 6

Election result

Ward results

References

2006 English local elections
2006
2000s in Greater Manchester